Take Care may refer to:

 Take Care (album), a 2011 album by Drake
 "Take Care" (song), its title song
 Take Care (film), a 2014 comedy-drama film
 "Take Care", a 1956 song by Jane Morgan
 "Take Care," a 1978 song by Big Star from Third
 "Take Care", a 2006 song by Janet Jackson from 20 Y.O.
 "Take Care", a 2010 song by Beach House from Teen Dream
 "Take Care", a 2011 song by Jennifer Lopez from Love?
 "take care", a 2018 song by Eden from vertigo
 Take Care, a program developed by primatologist Jane Goodall for creating microcredit banks and educating conservation methods to inhabitants near forests and national parks, such as Gombe National Park

See also
 Take Care, Take Care, Take Care, a 2011 album by Explosions in the Sky